George Washington Cohen is a 1928 American silent comedy drama film directed by George Archainbaud and starring George Jessel, Robert Edeson and Corliss Palmer. It was based on a vaudeville sketch The Cherry Tree by Aaron Hoffman. It was produced and released by Tiffany Pictures during John M. Stahl's period as head of production for the studio. It is now considered a lost film.

Synopsis
A naïve young man discovers a wallet in the street and returns it to its owner, wealthy Wall Street banker Gorman. Gorman is so impressed with his honesty that he gives the man, George Washington Cohen, a well-paid job. However, due to his inherent honesty Cohen feels duty bound to inform Gorman when he discovers his wife is having an affair. Gorman sues for divorce, and calls Cohen as the lead witness. However he has a change of heart and at last is able to tell a lie so that the Gormans will stay together for the sake of their children.

Cast
 George Jessel as George Washington Cohen
 Robert Edeson as 	Mr. Gorman
 Corliss Palmer as Mrs. Gorman
 Lawford Davidson as 	Mr. Connolly
 Florence Allen as 	Marian
 Jane La Verne as 	Child
 Paul Panzer 
 Edna Mae Cooper

References

Bibliography
 Goble, Alan. The Complete Index to Literary Sources in Film. Walter de Gruyter, 1999.
 Munden, Kenneth White. The American Film Institute Catalog of Motion Pictures Produced in the United States, Part 1. University of California Press, 1997.

External links
 

1928 films
1928 comedy films
1920s English-language films
American silent feature films
Silent American comedy films
American black-and-white films
Films directed by George Archainbaud
Tiffany Pictures films
Films set in New York City
1920s American films